Gauropterus is a genus of beetles belonging to the family Staphylinidae.

Species:
 Gauropterus fulgidus
 Gauropterus sanguinipennis

References

Staphylinidae
Staphylinidae genera